Berit Högman, born 1958, is a Swedish social democratic politician who has been a member of the Riksdag since 2002.

External links
Berit Högman at the Riksdag website

1958 births
Living people
Members of the Riksdag from the Social Democrats
Women members of the Riksdag
Members of the Riksdag 2002–2006
21st-century Swedish women politicians